Luis Alberto Solari (1918–1993) was a painter and engraver from Uruguay.

Background

He moved to Montevideo in 1934 to study at the Circulo de Bellas Artes with Professor William Laborde between 1934 and 1937. He pursued his particular interest in etching in 1952 during a three-month course at the l'Ecole Superieure des Beaux Arts in Paris with Professor Eduard GOERGEN.  From 1967 to 1969, he took advanced courses at the Pratt Graphic Center and the New York Graphic Workshop under the Brazilian Roberto De Lamonica and the Uruguayan Luis Camnitzer.

Exhibitions

He has exhibited at the Biennial of Graphic Arts in Santiago de Chile, Buenos Aires, Calí, San Juan, Puerto Rico, Florence, Krakow, Ljubljana, Frechen, Leipzig, Vienna, Norway, Finland, Bradford, Biella, Segovia and Japan.

Notable works

His most notable works, including mezzotint and acrylic paintings, are of human figures with anthropomorphic animal masks. Their costumes reveal rather than conceal their true identities.

Prizes

Amongst Solari's many prizes and distinctions were first prizes for drawing at the Salón Nacional de Bellas Artes in Montevideo in 1955 and 1964, the first prize for painting there in 1965 and the gold medal for printmaking at the first Bienal de Artes Gráficas in Calí, Colombia, in 1977. In 1989 the Museo Luis Alberto Solari opened in the city of Fray Bentos, Uruguay, showing his works and promoting fine arts in the region.

External links 

Some of his paintings on the Uruguayan national museum
Complete biography about Solari

1918 births
1993 deaths
People from Fray Bentos
Uruguayan people of Italian descent
20th-century Uruguayan painters
Uruguayan male artists
Male painters
20th-century Uruguayan male artists